Naduvattom or Naduvattam can refer to:
 Naduvattom, Malappuram, Kerala, India
 Naduvattam, Nilgiris, Tamil Nadu, India
Naduvattam (Ernakulam), Kerala, India